Radim Kopecký (born 7 June 1985) is a Czech footballer, who plays as a midfielder. He currently plays for 1. HFK Olomouc. Kopecký has played in the Gambrinus liga. He has played for his country at youth level.

References

External links

1985 births
Living people
Czech footballers
Czech Republic youth international footballers
Czech First League players
SK Sigma Olomouc players
FC Hlučín players
FK Fotbal Třinec players
1. HFK Olomouc players
Association football defenders